The 2016–17 Basketball Champions League was the inaugural season of the Basketball Champions League (BCL), a European professional basketball competition for clubs that was launched by FIBA. The competition began on 27 September 2016, with the qualifying rounds, and concluded on 30 April 2017, at the Final Four. It featured 16 domestic champion teams.  

A number of 52 teams from 31 countries participated in the competition, including its qualifying rounds. Iberostar Tenerife won the inaugural season of the BCL, after winning the final of the Final Four which was hosted in its home arena.

Format
The competition format suffered multiple adjustments since its official presentation on 21 March 2016, in Paris. Initially, the tournament would feature a total of 56 teams from 30 national leagues. Thirty-two teams would compete in the regular season, which included 24 teams qualified directly through sporting criteria, and eight teams advancing from a two-round qualifying phase comprising the remaining 32 teams. The 24 qualifying round losers would be transferred to the regular season of the 2016–17 FIBA Europe Cup. The 32 regular season teams would be drawn into four groups of eight, playing home-and-away matches against the other group teams in a round-robin system. The four best-placed teams of each group would qualify for the play-offs, while the eight 5th- and 6th-placed teams would transfer to the FIBA Europe Cup play-offs. In the play-offs, the round of 16 and the quarter-finals were played as two-legged home-and-away ties. The four quarterfinal winners would play in the Final Four of the competition.

On 29 June 2016, the competition board confirmed the participation of 48 teams from 31 countries. The qualifying rounds would be contested by 24 teams, with 16 entering the first round, and the remaining eight given a bye to the second round.
Ahead of the official draw ceremony on 21 July 2016, in Munich, the number of participating teams was increased to 49 and the qualifying rounds were again revised to accommodate 25 teams. The first qualifying round would include 18 teams divided into two pots according to geographical criteria. The nine winners would join the remaining seven teams directly placed in the second round.

On 19 August 2016, the organisation announced that AEK Athens, Dinamo Sassari, Partizan and Stelmet Zielona Góra had been accepted into the competition after withdrawing from the EuroCup. This expansion to 52 teams introduced overall changes in the competition format, namely the addition of a fifth group of eight teams (Group E) to the regular season. In addition, five teams were promoted from the qualifying rounds to this new regular season group, resulting in the promotion of eight teams from the first to the second qualifying round. The play-offs would also include an additional round before the round of 16, to accommodate an increase of qualified teams from 16 to 24 (four best-placed teams from each group and four best fifth-placed teams). The five group winners and three best runners-up from the regular season qualified directly for the round of 16, while the remaining 16 teams qualified for the preceding first round.

Team allocation
A total of 52 teams from 31 countries (of which 17 were champions) participated in the 2016–17 Basketball Champions League.

Teams
The labels in the parentheses show how each team qualified for the place of its starting round (FEC: FIBA Europe Cup title holders):
1st, 2nd, 3rd, 4th, 5th, etc.: League position after eventual Playoffs
CW: Cup winners

Notes

Round and draw dates
The schedule of the competition was as follows:

Qualifying rounds
In the qualifying rounds, teams were divided into pots based on geographical criteria, and then drawn into two-legged home-and-away ties. Teams from the same league could not be drawn against each other. The losing teams from both qualifying rounds competed in the regular season of the 2016–17 FIBA Europe Cup.

First qualifying round
A total of 18 teams entering the first qualifying round were divided into two pots – Region A (ten teams) and Region B (eight teams) – and pairings were drawn between teams within each pot. Following the competition expansion in August, and the resulting format changes, only four of the nine originally drawn ties were played.

The first legs were played on 27 September, and the second legs were played on 29 September 2016.

|}
Source: Basketball Champions League

Second qualifying round
A total of 16 teams were scheduled to play the second qualifying round, including the nine winners of the first round and seven teams with a bye to this round. As in the previous round, teams were divided into pots according to geographical criteria – Region A teams in Pots 1 and 2; Region B teams in Pots 3 and 4 – and pairings were drawn between teams within each region.

Following the competition expansion in August, and the resulting format changes, the revised second qualifying round fixture list kept three ties from the original draw and included four ties transferred from the first round. The eighth tie featured Bakken Bears, who were promoted to the second qualifying round, after Dinamo Sassari were in turn promoted to the regular season.

The first legs of series with teams involved in the first qualifying round were played on 4 October, and the second legs were played on 6 October 2016. The other four series were played one week before, their first leg on 27 September, and their second one on 29 September.

|}
Source: Basketball Champions League

Regular season

The 40 regular season teams were drawn into five groups of eight, with the restriction that teams from the same league could not be drawn against each other. In each group, teams played against each other in home-and-away games, in a round-robin format. The group winners, runners-up, third-placed, fourth-placed, and the top 4 fifth-placed teams advanced to the round of 16, while the sixth-placed and the seventh-placed teams were eligible to enter the 2016–17 FIBA Europe Cup round of 16. The match-days were 18–19 October, 25–26 October, 1–2 November, 8–9 November, 15–16 November, 22–23 November, 29–30 November, 6–7 December, 13–14 December, 20–21 December 2016, 3–4 January, 10–11 January, 17–18 January and 24–25 January 2017.

Draw
The regular season groups were drawn on 21 July 2016. The 24 teams originally directly qualified were divided into six pots of four teams each.

Teams from the same country were drawn in different groups.

Group A

Group B

Group C

Group D

Group E

Ranking of second-placed teams

Ranking of fifth-placed teams

Ranking of seventh-placed teams

Playoffs

In the playoffs, teams played against each other over two legs, on a home-and-away basis. The round of 16 included two phases. For this stage, the winning team from each group and the three best runners-up qualified directly to the second phase. For the first phase, the remaining sixteen teams from the same country could not be drawn against each other. For the second phase, the draw was entirely random, without country protection, and the winners of the first phase played against the teams that directly qualified to the second phase. From the quarter-finals onward, the draw was entirely random, without country protection.

Bracket

Playoffs qualifiers
The first legs were played on 7–8 February, and the second legs were played on 21–22 February  2017.

Round of 16
The first legs were played on 28 February–1 March, and the second legs were played on 7–8 March 2017.

Quarterfinals
The first legs were played on 21–22 March, and the second legs were played on 28–29 March 2017.

Final Four

The Final Four was the last phase of the season, and was held over a weekend. The semi-final games were played on Friday evening. Sunday started with the third-place game, followed by the championship game. The Final Four was played at the Santiago Martín in San Cristóbal de La Laguna, Spain, in April 2017.

Awards

Most Valuable Player

Final Four MVP

Star Lineup

Best Young Player

Game Day MVP

Regular season
The winner of the Weekly MVP award is selected by the official website of the Basketball Champions League, championsleague.basketball. The winner of the award is mainly determined by the efficiency stat, but this is not the only deciding factor, as sometimes players who did not have the highest efficiency rating win the award.

Playoffs Qualifiers MVP

Round of 16 MVP

Quarterfinals MVP

Statistics

Statistical leaders

Source: BasketballCL

Individual game highs

Source: BasketballCL

See also
2016–17 EuroLeague
2016–17 EuroCup Basketball
2016–17 FIBA Europe Cup

References

External links
Basketball Champions League (official website)
FIBA (official website)

 
Basketball Champions League